Keepin' The Faith is an album by American guitarist Steve Laury released in 1993, and recorded for Denon Records. AllMusic praised the album's "explosive creativity", and found the pairing of Laury and keyboardist Ron Satterfield a "musically satisfying partnership". The album reached No. 1 on the Billboard Contemporary Jazz chart.

Track listing
"Keepin' the Faith" (written by: Ron Satterfield / Steve Laury) - 6:38
"Close Your Eyes" (Steve Laury / Ron Satterfield) - 5:03
"Streets of Gold" (Steve Laury / Ron Satterfield) - 4:30
"Steppin' In" (Steve Lauty / Ron Satterfield) - 5:39
"October" (Ron Satterfield / Steve Laury) - 5:26
"There's One Way" (Steve Laury / Ron Satterfield) - 4:53
"Revelation" (Steve Laury / Ron Satterfield) - 5:25
"Tears in the Rain" (Ron Satterfield / Steve Laury) - 5:56
"Astoria" (Steve Laury / Ron Satterfield) - 4:57

Personnel
Steve Laury - guitar
Ron Satterfield - keyboards, bass, vocals
Duncan Moore - drums, percussion
Kevin Hennessey - bass
John Rekevics - saxophone, flute

Charts

References

External links
Keepin' The Faith at Discogs
Keepin' The Faith at AllMusic
Steve Laury plays Close Your Eyes at You Tube

1993 albums
Denon Records albums